The Long Weekend is a 2005 Canadian film starring Chris Klein and Brendan Fehr as two brothers, Cooper (Klein) and Ed Waxman (Fehr). It also stars Chelan Simmons, Paul Campbell, Chandra West, and Cobie Smulders.

Plot
Cooper is an actor who sees life as one big party, while Ed is in advertising and takes life too seriously. When Ed gets stressed over a deadline he has to meet, Cooper works to get his brother hooked up with a girl, thus a long weekend of stress and beautiful women, culminating in Ed's meeting, and making love to, the woman of his dreams- and all without his brother's meddling.

Cast
Chris Klein as Cooper Waxman
Brendan Fehr as Ed Waxman
Chelan Simmons as Susie
Cobie Smulders as Ellen
Paul Campbell as Roger
Chandra West as Kim
Andy Thompson as Officer Garcia
Evangeline Lilly as Simone

References

External links

Golden Circle Films, Official site.

2005 films
Canadian coming-of-age comedy films
2000s teen comedy films
Gold Circle Films films
Brightlight Pictures films
2000s coming-of-age comedy films
2000s English-language films
Films directed by Pat Holden
2000s Canadian films